Scania messia is a moth of the family Noctuidae. It is found from the Valparaíso to the Los Lagos Region of Chile, Buenos Aires, Tandil, La Rioja and Santa Fe in Argentina and Colonia, Estanzuela, Puntas Arcual, Montevideo and Paysandú in Uruguay.

The wingspan is about 31.6 mm. Adults are on wing from August to April.

The larvae feed on various agricultural crops, as well as Fagaceae species and  Brassica nigra.

External links
 Noctuinae of Chile

Noctuinae